Sani Ahmed is a Nigerian professional basketball coach who has led the Kano Pillars since 2006.

In 2006, 2010 and 2013, he was head coach of Nigeria's national basketball team.

References

External links
Afrobasket.com Profile

Living people
Nigerian basketball coaches
Year of birth missing (living people)